Thurinjapuram was one of the 234 constituencies in the Tamil Nadu Legislative Assembly of Tamil Nadu a southern state of India. It was in Tiruvannamalai district.

Members of Legislative Assembly

Election results

1962

References

External links

Tiruvannamalai district
Former assembly constituencies of Tamil Nadu